Anand is the administrative centre of Anand District in the state of Gujarat, India. It is administered by Anand Municipality. It is part of the region known as Charotar, consisting of Anand and Kheda districts.

Anand is known as Milk Capital of India. It became famous for Amul dairy and its milk revolution by the Amul trinity: Tribhuvandas Patel, Verghese Kurien and H. M. Dalaya.. This city hosts the Head Office of Gujarat Cooperative Milk Marketing Federation Ltd (GCMMF which is parent organisation for AMUL & co-operative operations to collect milk), NDDB of India, well known business school - Institute of Rural Management Anand (IRMA), Vidya Dairy and the Anand Agricultural University. Another famous educational hub is Vallabh Vidhyanagar, an educational suburb of Anand which has institutes like BVM (Birla Vishvkarma Mahavidhyalaya), which is first engineering college of Gujarat, GCET (G. H. Patel College of Engineering and Technology) ADIT(A.D Patel Institute Of Technology) and Sardar Patel University is home for around 50,000 students from all over India.

Anand lies between Ahmedabad and Vadodara on the Western Railways,  from the state capital Gandhinagar. It is a railway Junction and a broad gauge line from here runs to Godhra, covering Dakor, a major Hindu pilgrimage en route. MEMUs and one or two regular passenger trains ply on this route. It also has a branch line to Khambhat. DMUs Diesel Multiple Units ply on this route as it is not electrified yet. Anand Railway Station has 5 platforms, numbers 1, 2, 3 and 4 are on the main line and number 5 is on the branch line to Godhra. A new platform is in construction on the branch to Ahmedabad from the Godhra line forming a triangle. The Ahmedabad Vadodara Expressway from Ahmedabad to Vadodara also passes through Anand.

Geography 

Demographics 
 India census, Anand had a population of 634,987. Males constitute 51.77% of the population and females 48.23%. Anand has an average literacy rate of 78.45%, higher than the national average of 59.5% (55% of the males and 45% of females literate). 11% of the population is under 6 years of age. Average literacy rate of Anand in 2011 were 84.37 compared to 74.51 of 2001. Gender wise, male and female literacy were 91.82 and 76.36 respectively. For 2001 census, same figures stood at 86.09 and 61.94 in Anand District.

Economy 

Economy of the Anand is very vibrant which ranges from farming to big scale industries. Major crops includes Tobacco and Banana.  Anand is home to the famous Amul Dairy, Vidya Dairy, Amul Chocolate Plant, Mogar and Gujarat Co-operative Milk Marketing Federation. Anand is home to famous educational institute named Institute of Rural Management Anand. IRMA is a pioneering institution in rural management education and research. Vitthal Udhyog Nagar, a very big industrial belt is located on the outskirts of the city. Many famous industries including Elecon Engineering, Vulcan Industrial Engineering Co. Ltd, Warm Steam, The Charotar Iron Factory (est.1938), Milcent, Atlanta Electrics, Worldwide Overseas Travels and Alian Software are situated in this industrial belt. Also there are three vegetable markets which have developed in this city. The well known Shri Krishna Hospital, Karamsad is located near Anand.

Notable people 
H M Patel, Former Finance Minister of India
Verghese Kurien, the man who made the milk revolution possible
Harish Dave, Gujarati Poet
Sardar Vallabhbhai Patel, Freedom fighter, First home minister of India
Vishvesh Parmar, Bollywood singer was born in this city

References 

 District Collectorate Website: https://anand.nic.in/
 City Municipality Website: https://www.anandnagarpalika.com/
 Anand District Panchayat Website: https://ananddp.gujarat.gov.in/gu/Home 

Cities and towns in Anand district